The ASAM MCD-2 NET standard (called FIBEX for Field Bus Exchange Format) is an XML-based standardised format used for representing the networks used in automobiles. It is being used by the automotive industry for its ease of data exchange. 
It has extensibility required for the various network protocols (like FlexRay, MOST, CAN, TTCAN, LIN and Ethernet) used. It is developed by the ASAM consortium.

External links
Official ASAM website
Overview on Fibex on ASAM site
FIBEX XML format and AUTOSAR development

See also
AUTOSAR
XML

Industry-specific XML-based standards